The United Soccer League was a professional soccer league in the United States in the mid-1980s.

History
As the second incarnation of the American Soccer League was crumbling, five of the eight ASL teams (Carolina Lightnin', renamed the Charlotte Gold, Dallas Americans, Jacksonville Tea Men, Oklahoma City Slickers, renamed Stampede, and Rochester Flash) left to found the USL. They also took the ASL's commissioner, William Burfeind, with them as their first commissioner. Fiscal responsibility, regional rivalries and measured expansion were a few of the cornerstones on which the organization was to be structured. A league rule allowed only four of eighteen roster spots be taken by foreign players. In addition a salary cap was imposed on member clubs. Initially, the league was to have both indoor and outdoor seasons so that clubs could play year round.

In addition to the ASL holdovers were new teams Buffalo Storm, Fort Lauderdale Sun, Houston Dynamos, and New York Nationals. Two North American Soccer League teams, the Tampa Bay Rowdies and Tulsa Roughnecks, also expressed interest in joining the new league.

The USL played its first season in 1984 with nine teams in three divisions. The Fort Lauderdale Sun, whose roster featured former NASL Fort Lauderdale Strikers players Teófilo Cubillas, Keith Weller, Jim Tietjens, and Ernst Jean-Baptiste, won the league title in a three-game series against the Houston Dynamos

Despite its conservative fiscal plan, the league found itself in crisis heading into its second season. While attendance was on par with the ASL in its last season, revenues did not keep up with expenses and team owners could not cope with the losses. Houston left the league to be independent and all but two other clubs, Fort Lauderdale (now called South Florida Sun) and Dallas, folded. The evaporation of teams caused the cancellation of the planned indoor season. The Tulsa Tornados and El Paso/Juarez Gamecocks were added to bring league membership to a paltry four teams in 1985. A short six-game first half of the season was completed, but before a second half could begin the league's creditors foreclosed on the organization. The Sun led the league standings with a 4–2 record when the league collapsed. By virtue of their 1–0 win over Tulsa on June 15, the Sun also won the league's new Invitational Cup. As a harbinger of things to come, no actual cup was presented to them, causing Sun player-coach, Keith Weller, to quip, "There ain't no cup." The Sun played Dallas on June 22 at Lockhart Stadium, and the league folded shortly thereafter as league officials were locked out of their offices and the USL never played another game.

The collapse of the USL and the end of the NASL a year before meant that for the first time in over fifty years there was no professional outdoor soccer league in the U.S. This was a temporary void, however, as the Western Soccer Alliance and third incarnation of the American Soccer League would form and grow in the latter half of the 1980s, eventually to merge into the American Professional Soccer League, precursor to the USL First Division.

Champions

Teams
 Buffalo Storm (1984)
 Charlotte Gold (1984)
 Dallas Americans (1984–85)
 El Paso/Juarez Gamecocks (1985)
 Fort Lauderdale Sun (1984) → South Florida Sun (1985)
 Houston Dynamos (1984)
 Jacksonville Tea Men (1984)
 New York Nationals (1984)
 Oklahoma City Stampede (1984)
 Rochester Flash (1984)
 Tulsa Tornados (1985)

References

 
Sports leagues established in 1984
Sports leagues disestablished in 1985
1985 disestablishments in the United States
Defunct soccer leagues in the United States
Former summer association football leagues